The Black Shumen is an old breed of chicken originating in Shumen region of Bulgaria. In the middle of the 20th century it was crossed with Minorca chickens and later, briefly, with Rhode Island Red birds.

It is considered a rare breed. In 2013 the population was reported as 350. It is kept by the Bulgarian Poultry Institute in Stara Zagora and by a few members of the Bulgarian Poultry Breeders Association.

Characteristics

The Black Shumen is black with a greenish sheen; it has a single comb, white skin and red earlobes.

References

Further reading

External links

  at the BAPB
 Agrobiodiversity.net - Black Shumen chicken
 ELBARN - Black Shumen chicken

Chicken breeds originating in Bulgaria
Chicken breeds